The Quinault Indian Nation ( or ; QIN), formerly known as the Quinault Tribe of the Quinault Reservation, is a federally recognized tribe of Quinault, Queets, Quileute, Hoh, Chehalis, Chinook, and Cowlitz peoples. They are a Southwestern Coast Salish people of indigenous peoples of the Pacific Northwest Coast. Their tribe is located in Washington state on the Pacific coast of the Olympic Peninsula. These peoples are also represented in other tribes in Washington and Oregon.

In July 2016, about 2,500 landowners with interests in the Quinault Reservation were offered about $59 million by the U.S. Department of Interior as part of its Native Lands Buy-Back Program as part of the settlement of the Cobell v. Salazar class-action suit. The land purchased will be put into trust for the tribe at this reservation. Among other tribes, a range of 41 to 45% of people have accepted such offers.

Reservation

The Quinault Reservation was founded in 1855 with the signing of the Treaty of Olympia (also known as the Quinault River Treaty) with the United States. It is bordered by the Olympic National Park to the northwest, which was established in 1909 as a National Monument by President Teddy Roosevelt.

The three largest rivers on the reservation are the Quinault, the Queets, and the Raft. The Quinault Indian Nation owns Lake Quinault.

Taholah

Taholah is the largest settlement in the Quinault Reservation and is home to the tribal government's main facilities. In 2015, the tribal government proposed a $60 million plan to relocate the village to an uphill area southeast of the existing village, away from potential tsunami and flooding hazard zones. Construction on the relocated village began in 2019. The first part of the relocated village, a senior and children center named the Generations Building, opened in May 2021.

Government
The Quinault Indian Nation is headquartered in Taholah, Washington. They ratified their bylaws on 24 August 1922 and their constitution in 1975.

The tribe is governed by an eleven-member Tribal Council, or "Business Committee", which is democratically elected by the adult tribal membership (the General Council) at regular annual meetings. The current tribal administration is as follows:
 President: Guy Capoeman
 Vice President: Fawn Sharp
 Treasurer: Larry Ralston
 Secretary: Latosha Underwood
 1st councilwoman: Gina James
 2nd councilmen: Jim Sellers
 3rd councilmen: John Bryson Jr. 
 4th councilwoman: Noreen Underwood
 5th councilwoman: Dawneen Delacruz
 6th councilwoman: Clarinda Underwood
 7th councilmen: Thomas Obi.

Enrollment to the Quinault Indian Tribe requires a minimum blood quantum of one-fourth of any combination of the seven member tribes. Persons who are direct descendants of members but have less than one-fourth blood quantum can apply to be formally adopted into the tribe.

Language
English is commonly spoken by the tribe. Formerly tribal members spoke Quileute, Cowlitz, and Chinook languages.

Economic development

The Quinault Indian Nation owns Quinault Pride Seafood, Land, and Timber Enterprises, and the Mercantile in Taholah, Washington. They run their own internal facilities and in the 21st century are the largest employer in Grays Harbor County.

They also own Qmart 2 in Aberdeen.

Since 2009, the casino has been the site of the annual Hog Wild Rally, one of the largest motorcycle rallies in the Pacific Northwest.

In June 2018, $25 million in renovations and expansion to the Quinault Beach Resort and Casino were completed. This project included remodeling of 159 resort rooms, additional gaming area, a new feature bar, kitchen facilities and a tribal themed buffet restaurant.

Notes

References

External links
 Quinault Indian Nation, official website
 Constitution of the Quinault Indian Nation
 Economic Development of QIN

Coast Salish governments
Native American tribes in Washington (state)
Geography of Grays Harbor County, Washington
Geography of Jefferson County, Washington
Federally recognized tribes in the United States
Indigenous peoples of the Pacific Northwest Coast
Quileute
Quinault